Whaddon is a suburb in the North Eastern part of Cheltenham, Gloucestershire, England. Whaddon consists of council housing built in the 1940s and 50s, making up Whaddon and Lynworth council estates. Whaddon is located less than a mile from Cheltenham town centre. Whaddon Road, the home of Cheltenham Town Football Club (currently playing in the EFL League One) is situated here.

Location  
Clyde Crescent (a large circular park) can be deemed as constituting its geographical centre and is the focus of many community based activities, particularly during the summer. Another centre of community activity are Parklands Community Centre.

Much of Whaddon's housing affords views of the nearby escarpment that surrounds this part of Cheltenham, part of which has been designated by the Countryside Agency as an Area of Outstanding Natural Beauty or AONB.

References 

Whaddon